The 2000 Cal Poly Mustangs football team represented California Polytechnic State University during the 2000 NCAA Division I-AA football season.

Cal Poly competed as an NCAA Division I-AA independent in 2000. The Mustangs were led by fourth-year head coach Larry Welsh and played home games at Mustang Stadium in San Luis Obispo, California. The Mustangs finished the season with a record of three wins and eight losses (3–8) for the third consecutive year. Overall, the team was outscored by its opponents 246–345 for the season. This was the last year as Cal Poly head coach for Larry Welsh. He finished his four years with a record of 19-25, or a .431 winning percentage.

Schedule

Team players in the NFL
No Cal Poly Mustang players were selected in the 2001 NFL Draft.

The following finished their college career in 2000, were not drafted, but played in the NFL.

Notes

References

Cal Poly
Cal Poly Mustangs football seasons
Cal Poly Mustangs football